The E. H. Higgins House, at 1530 E. 7th St. in Hopkinsville, Kentucky, is an American Four Square house built in 1920.  It was listed on the National Register of Historic Places in 1984.

It was deemed to be a "fine example of the American Four-square style".  It is a two-and-a-half-story house built upon a stone foundation.  It has a hipped roof with a central dormer and it has a one-story porte-cochere.

References

American Foursquare architecture
National Register of Historic Places in Christian County, Kentucky
Houses completed in 1920
Hopkinsville, Kentucky
1920 establishments in Kentucky
Houses on the National Register of Historic Places in Kentucky
Houses in Christian County, Kentucky